Problem shaping means revising a question so that the solution process can begin or continue.  
It is part of the larger problem process that includes problem finding and problem solving. Problem shaping (or problem framing) often involves the application of critical thinking.

Algorithmic approach to technical problems reformulation was introduced by G. S. Altshuller in ARIZ.

See also

 Adaptive reasoning
 Abductive reasoning
 Analogy
 Artificial intelligence
 Brainstorming
 Common sense
 Common sense reasoning
 Creative problem solving
 Cyc
 Deductive reasoning
 Divergent thinking
 Educational psychology
 Executive function
 Facilitation (business)
 General Problem Solver
 Inductive reasoning
 Innovation
 Intelligence amplification
 Inquiry
 Morphological analysis (problem-solving)
 Newell, Allen
 PDCA
 Problem statement
 Problem structuring methods
 Research question
 Simon, Herbert
 Soar (cognitive architecture)
 Thought
 Transdisciplinarity
 TRIZ
 Troubleshooting
 Wicked problem

References

Problem solving